Parti Bumiputera Perkasa Malaysia (Malay for "Malaysia Mighty Bumiputera Party", Jawi: ڤرتي بوميڤوترا ڤركاس مليسيا, Abbr.: PUTRA) is a nationalist political party in Malaysia. The party was founded and led by Ibrahim Ali.

History
Ibrahim Ali who is also the founding president of Pertubuhan Pribumi Perkasa (PERKASA), a Non-governmental Organisation (NGO) for Malay supremacy, had announced a new party would be set-up to serve as an alternative to the Malays and would champion the rights of the Malays and Islam after the 2018 general election which saw the downfall of Barisan Nasional (BN) and United Malays National Organisation (UMNO) government; echoing his earlier projection in 2013 of turning PERKASA into a full-fledged political party.

PUTRA formation was first unveiled and announced by Ibrahim Ali as the party pro-tem president on 17 August 2018. following its online registration application on 13 August, delivery of its establishment documents on 16 August; and subsequently a few meetings then with the Registrar of Societies (RoS).

In March 2019, Ibrahim had filed a court application for leave and judicial review to challenge the action by RoS to not approve PUTRA and sought a mandamus order to compel the respondent to approve the application for registration by PUTRA. Finally PUTRA registration was approved and recognised by the RoS on 8 May. PUTRA was officially launched by Ibrahim in Kampung Baru, Kuala Lumpur on 28 September.

Almost all of party constitution of PUTRA is based on the constitution of the "original" UMNO founded in 1946, to match the pure goals of the party in the beginning. The party's membership is open to all Malay, including Bumiputera Malaysians but also non-Bumiputera who are Muslims as associate members.

On 10 August 2022, PUTRA vice president and former Member of the Perak State Legislative Assembly (MLA) for Sungai Rapat Hamidah Osman left the party with immediate effect upon her disappointment and sadness over the party joining Gerakan Tanah Air (GTA), a new political coalition consisting of Homeland Fighters Party (PEJUANG) led by former Prime Minister Mahathir Mohamad and other Malay-based political parties five days prior on 5 August 2022 as well as her loss of trust in party president Ibrahim Ali and other party leaders. She also noted that she would carry on championing the issue of Malay reserve land through other platforms like the non-governmental organisation (NGO).

On 25 February 2023, Mahathir joined PUTRA along with 12 other former PEJUANG members.

General election results

State election results
PUTRA had made a debut contesting for 5 seats in the 2021 Malacca state election. In 2022 Johor state election, the only seat that PUTRA had contesting is Semerah. However, it didn't win any single seats.

See also 
 Ibrahim Ali
 Pertubuhan Pribumi Perkasa (Perkasa)
 United Malays National Organisation (UMNO)
 List of political parties in Malaysia
 Malaysian General Election
 Politics of Malaysia

References

External links 
 
 

Political parties established in 2019
2019 establishments in Malaysia
Political parties in Malaysia
Islamic political parties in Malaysia
Malaysian nationalism
Ethnic political parties
Identity politics